The Philippine House Special Committee on Bases Conversion is a special committee of the Philippine House of Representatives.

Jurisdiction 
As prescribed by House Rules, the committee's jurisdiction includes the following:
 Construction of new military camps
 Operation of special economic zones in former military bases
 Policies and programs relating to bases conversion
 Relocation of military camps and personnel
 Sale of military camps and disposition of proceeds thereof

Members, 18th Congress

Historical members

18th Congress

Chairperson 
 Francis Gerald Abaya (Cavite–1st, Liberal) August 14, 2019 – October 12, 2020

Member for the Majority 
 Francisco Datol Jr. (SENIOR CITIZENS)

See also 
 House of Representatives of the Philippines
 List of Philippine House of Representatives committees
 Bases Conversion and Development Authority

Notes

References

External links 
House of Representatives of the Philippines

Bases Conversion
Military of the Philippines